Jean Lenoir may refer to:

 Jean-Charles-Pierre Lenoir (1732–1807), French lawyer and policeman
 Jean-Claude Lenoir (born 1944), member of the National Assembly of France
 Jean Lenoir (composer) (1891–1976), French film and popular composer
 Étienne Lenoir (1822–1900), also known as Jean J. Lenoir, built the first practical gas engine